Dominika Cibulková was the defending champion, but she chose not to defend her title.

Timea Bacsinszky won the title, defeating Caroline Garcia in the final, 6–3, 6–0.

Seeds

Draw

Finals

Top half

Bottom half

Qualifying

Seeds

Qualifiers

Lucky losers

Draw

First qualifier

Second qualifier

Third qualifier

Fourth qualifier

External links
 WTA tournament draws

2015 Abierto Mexicano Telcel